Priyantha Perera may refer to:

Niroshan Perera, Sri Lankan politician
Priyantha Perera (naval officer), Sri Lankan naval officer